The 1991 Lokhandwala Complex shootout was a gunbattle that occurred on 16 November 1991 at the Lokhandwala Complex, Bombay (now Mumbai), between seven gangsters led by Maya Dolas and members of the Mumbai Police and the Anti-Terrorism Squad (ATS) led by the then Additional Commissioner of Police, A. A. Khan. The four-hour-long shootout was termed as India's "first daylight encounter" and was videographed and conducted in full view of the public. It ended in the deaths of all seven gangsters, including Maya Dolas, Dilip Buwa and Anil Pawar.

Prelude

In the late 1980s, the Bombay Underworld was under the firm control of the D-Company, headed by Dawood Ibrahim. From his base in Dubai, Ibrahim controlled underworld activities through his various lieutenants. Among the most prominent was Mahindra Dolas, a gangster who was known more popularly by his nickname Maya. Dolas had got his start running several successful extortion rackets for the criminal-politician, Ashok Joshi's gang at Kanjurmarg. On 3 December 1988, Joshi was killed at the Bombay-Pune road near Panvel by a 15-man hit squad led by Chhota Rajan at Ibrahim's orders.

After Joshi's murder, Dolas later broke out of the Ashok Joshi gang, and formed his own gang. He then convinced notorious Joshi gang sharpshooter Dilip Buwa to switch sides and together on 17 September 1989, they led a stealth attack against the Joshi gang in Kanjurmarg, in which five people were killed. This brought them into favour with Ibrahim, who was gunning for the Joshi gang after the killing of his pointman Satish Raje. Dolas and Buwa were a feared duo and soon began a steady rise within the ranks of the D-Company. They also conducted extortion activities on Ibrahim's behalf. However, they were also fugitives on the run, with ongoing arrest warrants for them. Dolas, had in fact escaped from prison a few years prior to the shootout.

Shootout 
News and current affairs video magazine Newstrack captured the entire shootout live in 1991. According to the former Additional Commissioner of Police A. A. Khan, the Anti-Terrorism Squad received a tip-off from a police informer that Dolas and his gang were hiding in the A wing, flats no. 002 and 003 in the Swati building at the Lokhandwala Complex, a posh upper middle class residential area. The informer reported that they were armed and were waiting for a few builders who would be coming in the evening. The apartment in which they were hiding belonged to Gopal Rajwani, a fugitive gangster from Ulhasnagar and associate of Ibrahim. The ATS formed three teams for the task of arresting the fugitives and taking them into custody. One was for reconnaissance, while the other two cordoned off the spot.

What happened next is subject to dispute and controversy. According to the official police version, Officer M. I. Qavi was the first to go there. Qavi spotted Gopal Rajwani at the main gate, but did not arrest him for fear of surprising the gangsters hidden inside the building. On the other hand, Rajwani did not recognise the police officers, who were in their plain clothes, and escaped without any incident. The ATS officers Sunil Deshmukh, Z. M. Gharal and Qavi along with a handful of police officers were the first to walk into the ground-floor apartment where seven of them were watching TV. When they burst into the apartment, six of the gangsters, including Dolas, raised their arms in surprise.

Dilip Buwa, who was armed with an AK-47 assault rifle, opened fire on the officers. Officer Gharal, who was not wearing body armour, was shot in the chest twice, puncturing his lungs. Qavi was shot in the elbow. Buwa's brazen attack was soon followed by the others. The ground-floor apartment had two doors, one opening into the compound and the other to the building's staircase. While the police officers came out from the front door, the gangsters escaped into the interiors using the stairs.

Khan used the loudspeakers to request residents to go to the kitchen and lie on the floor, to avoid accidentally getting hit by a stray bullet. He also asked the gangsters to surrender, even when half the force was surrounding the building. The gangsters refused to surrender and responded with bullets and profanities. In the ensuing shootout, the police used 450 rounds of ammunition. Every other wall on all sides of the building was rained heavily with bullets. At the end, all seven gangsters were killed, with the last gangster being shot down at the terrace of Swati building. Although post-shootout media coverage made out Dolas to be the main shooter, according to Khan, in reality it was Buwa. Khan stated that Dolas just kept hurling abuses from inside the building, while the real bullets were being pumped by Buwa:

Aftermath
The shootout resulted in a great deal of controversy for the ATS. The ATS was suspected of staging a fake encounter and subsequently dragged to court. A magisterial inquiry was ordered as questions were raised on the use of 450 rounds of ammunition and the need for a “daylight” encounter. The ATS was also charged with walking away with Rs 7 million which belonged to Dolas. Petitions alleging corruption were also filed against Khan. However, the trial ended with Khan and other involving ATS officers acquittal.

The fugitive underworld don Chotta Rajan was also extremely vocal in criticising the police operation as a "fake encounter". According to Chotta Rajan, the encounter was planned by his former boss Dawood Ibrahim, when they were allies, as part of a campaign to downsize Rajan's gang and curtail his power. He further claimed that the ground level co-ordination for the operation was conducted by a Dawood Ibrahim subordinate, Samir Shah. He stated that Dolas had expressed his willingness to surrender, but the police insisted on eliminating him.

Khan dismissed the allegations as ridiculous, claiming that Dolas and the others were in no mood to surrender. He asserted that the operation was videographed and it was conducted in full view of the public. He further stated that a public interest litigation claiming that the encounter was stage-managed was dismissed by the Bombay high court. The court even dubbed it "vexatious litigation". He also justified the shootout, by stating that it had a demoralising effect on the Bombay underworld. In the aftermath of the Lokhandwala encounter, three dreaded shooters fled the city. While Subash Sawant and Subash Singh Thakur fled to Nepal, Anil Parab fled to Dubai.

While the Lokhandwala shootout made Khan famous, he later faced criticism about the way he handled the Bombay riots under his jurisdiction. The Bharatiya Janata Party and the Shiv Sena protested his alleged partisan attitude towards their workers in the riots. In 1995, when the BJP-Shiv Sena government came to power in Maharashtra, Khan promotion to the rank of Additional Director General of Police was stalled and he was transferred to Nagpur. Frustrated at this insignificant posting, Khan retired and set up a security agency in 1996, which his son now runs. He also became a politician and joined the Janata Dal, with whom he stood elections in the Mumbai North-west constituency in 1998.

Gopal Rajwani, the gangster who had inadvertently managed to avoid being caught in the crossfire, returned to Ulhasnagar and joined politics as a Shiv Sena member in 1995. He was eventually shot dead by four of rival mobster Pappu Kalani's henchmen on 24 January 2000 in the premises of the First Class Magistrate's court there.

In popular culture

The infamous shootout was immortalised in the 2007 film Shootout at Lokhandwala, starring Sanjay Dutt as ACP Aftab Ahmed Khan, Vivek Oberoi as Maya Dolas, Tushar Kapoor as Dilip Buwa and Amrita Singh as Maya's mother Ratnaprabha Dolas. The movie also featured the real-life former ACP Aftab Ahmed Khan in a cameo role as his superior, the police commissioner Krishnamurthy.

The film was however, criticised by underworld don Chotta Rajan on grounds that it grossly distorted the facts. In a May 2007 interview, he told the Times of India newspaper that the encounter was fake, while the film sought to depict it as an actual event. He stated that he would take it to the film's producer Sanjay Gupta, although when questioned, Gupta refused to pass any comment. The film makers were unable to film the shootout scene in the real Swati building, a set worth 5 million was constructed in Film City which consisted of seven buildings and roads and trees and made it look exactly like how Swati building was in 1991.

See also
List of cases of police brutality in India

References

External links
 Indian news report on the shootout, on youtube.com

 
Lokhandwala Complex Shootout, 1991
History of Mumbai (1947–present)
D-Company
1990s in Mumbai
1991 murders in India
Mass shootings in India
1991 mass shootings in Asia